= Miquel-Lluís Muntané =

Spanish sociologist and writer

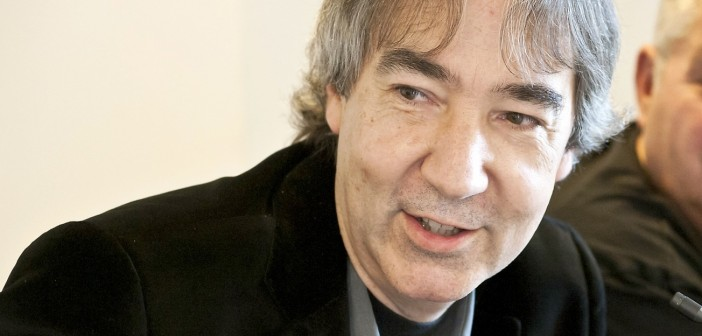
- Born: 1956 (age 69–70) Barcelona
- Notable awards: Plemi Climent Mur (2007)

Miquel-Lluís Muntané i Sicart (born 1956 in Barcelona) is a Spanish sociologist and Catalan language writer. He has worked in teaching, advertising, publishing and as an Arts Administrator.

From an early age he has been involved in civic and cultural activities. He works in the written and audio-visual domains of the mass media. He is author of narrative works, poetry, essays and theatre and has also translated different works from French. He is ex-president of Federació Catalana d'Associacions UNESCO and currently he is the president of the Associació de Crítics i Comentaristes Musicals en Llengua Catalana, as well as a member of the Culture Council of Barcelona. In 2007, he was awarded the Premi Climent Mur for his work in associative activities, which include participating in congresses, seminars and giving lectures.

Critics have highlighted, about his poetry, the capacity to reflect upon human condition through a meticulous observation of detail. This, together with an in depth knowledge of the language and literary devices, make of him one of the most suggestive poetic voices of his generation.

== Works ==
- L'esperança del jonc (poetry, 1980)
- Crònica d'hores petites (narrative, 1981)
- Llegat de coratge (poetry, 1983)
- A influx del perigeu (poetry, 1985)
- De portes endins (play, 1987)
- Antoni Coll i Cruells, el valor d'una tasca (biography, 1987)
- L'espai de la paraula (essay, 1990)
- Actituds individuals per la pau (essay, 1991)
- La penúltima illa (play, 1992)
- L'altra distància (poetry, 1994)
- Millor actriu secundària (novel, 1997)
- El foc i la frontera (poetry, 1997)
- UNESCO, història d'un somni (essay, 2000)
- Madrigal (narrative, 2001)
- Migdia a l'obrador (poetry, 2003)
- La fi dels dies llargs (novel, 2005)
- La seducció dels rius (journey chronicles, 2006)
- Cultura i societat a la Barcelona del segle XVII (essay, 2007)
- Encetar la poma. Escrits sobre cultura (articles, 2008)
- El tomb de les batalles (poetry, 2009)
- La hiedra obstinada (poetry, 2010) (Spanish translation of "L'altra distància" and "Migdia a l'obrador" by J.A.Arcediano and A.García-Lorente)
- Hores tangents (poetry, 2012)
- De sèver i de quars. Apunts memorialístics 1981-1999 (memories, 2015)
- Qualitats de la fusta (poetry, 2016)
- El moviment coral dins el teixit social català (essay, 2016)
- Frontisses. Mirades a una primavera (journey chronicles, 2018)
- Miquel Pujadó, el bard incombustible (biography, 2019)
- Diu que diuen... (narrative for children, 2019)
- Horas tangentes (poetry, 2020) (Spanish translation)
- Passatges (poetry, 2020)
